Peleg is a son of the legendary ancestor, Eber, of the Israelites.

Peleg also may refer to:
 Peleg (name), and real people bearing it
Institutions in Rhode Island named for people bearing the given name:
 Peleg Arnold Tavern, in North Smithfield, built around 1690
 Peleg Champlin House, historic house in New Shoreham

 Capt. Peleg,  Moby Dick fictional character, retired ship-captain and "fighting"-Quaker part-owner of whaling ship
 Peleg Yerushalmi, Hebrew name for Jerusalem Faction, an Israeli political organization